The Direction of Last Things is the fifth studio album by American progressive metal band Intronaut. The album was announced in August 2015 and released through Century Media on November 13, 2015. Singles “Fast Worms” and “Digital Gerrymandering” were released in September and October of 2015, respectively. The album was recorded and produced by Josh Newell with mixing by Devin Townsend.

Speaking on the album, front man Sacha Dunable stated: "I don't care how cliché it is to say; this is our best record yet! This is Intronaut at our most technical, brutal, catchy, and straight up fearless. I haven't been this proud of an album since we recorded our first demo 10 years ago." Commenting on the recording process Dunable also said “We decided that we don’t need to spend three weeks in a studio obsessing over every minute nuance…We ended up making our best sounding record in a third of the time.”

Reception
Upon release the album gained generally favorable reviews among mainstream and metal critics. Angry Metal Guy gave the album a “good” rating of 3/5, describing the album as “a decent proggy platter” that displays “technicality and impressive musicianship” an album that is “not exactly brutal or fast, but its presence helps give diversity to the music”. Crash and Ride Music said the album was “very interesting” with “a dose of metal and a pinch of progressive,” criticizing some songs for “[overstaying] their welcome”.

Track listing

Personnel
 Intronaut
 Sacha Dunable – guitar, vocals
 Joe Lester – bass
 Danny Walker – drums, samples
 Dave Timnick – guitar, vocals, tabla, additional percussion

 Production
 Josh Newell – producer, engineering
 Devin Townsend – mixing

References

2015 albums
Intronaut albums
Century Media Records albums